Joel Nyström (born 14 May 2002) is a Swedish professional ice hockey defenceman for Färjestad BK of the Swedish Hockey League (SHL). Nyström was drafted in the seventh round, 219th overall, by the Carolina Hurricanes in the 2021 NHL Entry Draft.

Career statistics

Awards and honors

References

External links
 

2002 births
Living people
Carolina Hurricanes draft picks
Färjestad BK players
Sportspeople from Karlstad
Swedish ice hockey defencemen